Dunmore is a town in County Galway, Ireland. It is located on the N83 national secondary road at its junction with the R328 and R360 regional roads.

The town belongs to an ancient tuath called Conmhaícne Dúna-Móir and Cenél Dubáin, ruled by Uí Conchobair of Ui Briuin Ai from the 12th century, and a capital of Connacht for a time. King Tairrdelbach Ua Conchobair died here in 1156.

Until the early 1980s, the N83 through Dunmore was on the main road from Sligo to Galway City. Improvements to the N17 route through Knock and Claremorris reduced the amount of traffic on the N83.

History
The ruins of Dunmore Castle are situated on a small hillock outside the village. The first castle at this site was built by the Anglo-Norman de-Birmingham family in the early 13th century. Designed as a bulwark against the native Irish, the castle was attacked in 1249 and burned by the O’Connor's. In 1284 it was besieged by the forces of Fichra O’ Flynn. In 1315 it was once more the scene of conflict when an army, led by Rory Connor, attacked and damaged the fortress.

Sport
Dunmore McHales is the local Gaelic Athletic Association club.

The local association football (soccer) club, Dunmore Town AFC, was founded in 1979 and fields some underage teams in the Roscommon League.

Dunmore RFC was founded in 1977 and Dunmore Demesne Golf Club in 1998.

Annalistic references

 AI1095.10 Ua hEgra, king of Luigne, was slain by the Cenél Dubáin; and Luigne and western Connachta were vacated and [their inhabitants] came into Mumu.

International relations

Dunmore is twinned with the village of Querrien in France.

Notable people
Michael J. Kennedy (1900–1978), Irish melodeon player
Michael Donnellan (1900–1964), Clann na Talmhan politician
Gideon Ouseley (1762–1839), evangelical preacher
Henry Mossop (1729–1773), actor
Tairrdelbach Ua Conchobair (1088–1156), King of Ireland

See also
List of abbeys and priories in Ireland (County Galway)
List of towns and villages in Ireland
Conmaicne Dúna Móir

References

External links

Dunmore Community School website
On the History and Antiquities of the Parish of Dunmore by Rev. J. Neary (1913)

Towns and villages in County Galway
Conmaicne Dúna Móir
Places of Conmaicne Dúna Móir